Micro Machines World Series is a racing video game developed and published by Codemasters for Microsoft Windows, OS X, Linux, PlayStation 4, and Xbox One.

Reception

Critical reception
Micro Machines World Series received "mixed or average" reviews, according to review aggregator Metacritic, partially due to its lack of career mode and spotty online multiplayer.

Hardcore Gamer awarded it a positive score of 4 out of 5, saying "Micro Machines World Series" is a great buy for anyone who enjoyed prior entries in the series or simply wants a great racing game that the whole family can enjoy". PlayStation LifeStyle awarded it a more negative score of 4.5 out of 10: "This could get fixed into a solid game, but players should be cautious until an overhaul occurs". Hobby Consoles said that the "12 player online mode is not enough to compensate the absence of a career mode, the technical failures and some online design problems (such as the lobby system and menus)".

Sales
It debuted at number 2 on the UK all format video games sales charts.

Notes

References

Micro Machines (video game series)
2017 video games
Codemasters games
Linux games
Multiplayer and single-player video games
MacOS games
PlayStation 4 games
Windows games
Xbox One games
Video games developed in the United Kingdom